Lemn Sissay  FRSL (born 21 May 1967) is a British author and broadcaster. Sissay was the official poet of the 2012 London Olympics, has been chancellor of the University of Manchester since 2015, and joined the Foundling Museum's board of trustees two years later, having previously been appointed one of the museum's fellows. He was awarded the 2019 PEN Pinter Prize. He has written a number of books and plays.

Early life

Sissay's mother, Yemarshet Sissay, arrived in Britain from Ethiopia in 1966. Pregnant at the time, she was sent from Bracknell to a home for unwed mothers in Lancashire to give birth. His birth father, Giddey Estifanos, was a pilot for Ethiopian Airlines, who later passed away in a plane crash in 1972. Sissay was born in Billinge Hospital, near Wigan, Lancashire, in 1967.  Norman Goldthorpe, a social worker assigned to his mother by Wigan Social Services, found foster parents for Sissay while his mother returned to Bracknell to finish her studies.

Goldthorpe named Sissay "Norman" and put him in the care of foster parents, telling them to treat the placement as an adoption. The events are depicted in the play Something Dark and in BBC documentary Internal Flight. His strongly religious foster parents wanted to name him Mark after the Christian evangelist Mark and give him their surname, Greenwood.

When Sissay was 12 years old, his foster parents—who, by then, had three biological children of their own—placed him in a children's home and said no one from their family would contact him again.

Between the ages of 12 and 17, Sissay was held in a total of four children's homes. With no surrogate or birth family to turn to when he aged out of the care system, he was finally given his birth certificate, revealing the name of his mother, Yemarshet Sissay, and his own legal name, Lemn Sissay. He was also given a letter from his files, dated 1968, written by his mother to Norman Goldthorpe, pleading for her son's return. She wrote: "How can I get Lemn back? I want him to be with his own people, his own colour. I don't want him to face discrimination." From the point of leaving care, he began the search for his mother and took back his real name.

At the age of 17, Sissay used his unemployment benefit money to self-publish his first poetry pamphlet, Perceptions of the Pen, which he sold to striking miners in Lancashire. When he was 18 years old, he moved from Atherton to the city of Manchester. At 19, he was a literature development worker at Commonword, a community publishing cooperative in Manchester.

Sissay met his birth mother when he was 21, after a long search. She was working for the UN in the Gambia.

Career

Sissay released his first book of poetry in 1988 at the age of 21, and since the age of 24 he has been a full-time writer, performing internationally. In 1995, he made the BBC documentary Internal Flight about his life. His 2005 drama Something Dark deals with his search for his family, and was adapted for BBC Radio 3 in 2006, winning the UK Commission for Racial Equality's Race in the Media Award (RIMA).

In 2007, Sissay was appointed artist-in-residence at London's Southbank Centre. He was the official poet of the 2012 London Olympics, has worked with the British Council and is a patron of the Letterbox Club, supporting children in care. His work has featured at the Royal Academy and the British Film Institute. Sissay was made an Honorary Doctor of Letters by the University of Huddersfield in 2009 and was appointed Member of the Order of the British Empire (MBE) in the 2010 New Year Honours. In 2014 Sissay was appointed as a Fellow of the Foundling Museum.

Sissay's television appearances include The South Bank Show and the BBC's series Grumpy Old Men. As a radio broadcaster he makes documentaries for the BBC. He is a regular contributor on BBC Radio 4's programme Saturday Live, which in 2008 was nominated for two Sony Awards. He also contributes to the BBC's Book Panel.

In 2015, Sissay became the patron of ALL FM 96.9 Community Radio in Manchester, and he said: "I've always loved All Fm, partly because it's such diverse radio (with shows in Urdu, Polish, Somali, Persian, Cantonese and more), but also because it played 'Architecture' (Bertallot & Mo-Dus Remix), which I'd lost and the All Fm DJ sent me a copy." Sissay's poems are read frequently on All Fm and one of its older presenters, Li, aged 84, translated and read his poem "Invisible Kisses" in Mandarin and English. She said: "I love his poetry because it is so moving and not skin-deep."

In June 2015, Sissay was elected as chancellor of the University of Manchester for a seven-year term by university staff, registered alumni and members of the General Assembly. He took up his new role on 1 August, with an installation ceremony held on Foundation Day at the university on 14 October 2015, at which he said: "Reach for the top of the tree and you may get to the first branch but reach for the stars and you'll get to the top of the tree. My primary aim is to inspire and be inspired. I am proud to be Chancellor of this fantastic university and extremely grateful to everyone who voted for me." In the same month, Sissay was the castaway on BBC Radio 4's Desert Island Discs.

In January 2016, Sissay wrote an article in The Guardian about the Foundling Museum's "Drawing on Childhood" exhibition in which he noted: "How a society treats those children who have no one to look after them is a measure of how civilised it is. It is scandalous that a prime minister should have to admit, as David Cameron did last autumn, that the care system 'shames our country' and that Ofsted should report that there are more councils judged as 'inadequate' than 'good' for their children’s services." Later that year he became the patron of theatre company 20 Stories High, based in Toxteth, Liverpool, which creates diverse theatre including beatboxing, singing, puppetry and other media. In October of the same year, BBC Radio 4 broadcast the series Lemn Sissay's Origin Stories in which he discussed his life; it was rebroadcast a year later.

In April 2017, Sissay joined the Foundling Museum's board of trustees. Later that year it was announced that he would appear in a revival of Jim Cartwright's 1986 play Road at the Royal Court Theatre. In September 2017, Sissay used his position as chancellor of the University of Manchester to launch a new bursary with the purpose of increasing the numbers of black men taking up careers in law and criminal justice. The initiative, part of the university's school of law's Black Lawyers Matter project, was created after it was found that "out of some 1,200 undergraduates, only 14 UK-based Black males of African and Caribbean heritage were registered on law and criminology courses, and of these none were from lower socio-economic backgrounds".

In the same year, he staged a one-off show, entitled The Report, based on a psychologist's report about Sissay's early life and how it affected him. The show details his experience with social services, foster homes, abuse and his psychiatric diagnoses: post-traumatic stress disorder, avoidant personality disorder and alcohol use disorder. He brought a case against Wigan Council that was settled in 2018 with a six-figure payout and a formal apology to Sissay for the treatment he suffered when in care.

In June 2019 it was announced that Sissay had won the 2019 PEN Pinter Prize, awarded to writers who take an "unflinching, unswerving" view of the world, with one of the judging panel, Maureen Freely, saying: "In his every work, Lemn Sissay returns to the underworld he inhabited as an unclaimed child. From his sorrows, he forges beautiful words and a thousand reasons to live and love."

In January 2020, Sissay joined the Booker Prize judging panel, alongside Margaret Busby (chair), Lee Child, Sameer Rahim and Emily Wilson.

In December 2020, he was featured walking in Dentdale towards England's highest railway station, in the Winter Walks series on BBC Four.

In May 2021, Sissay appeared on BBC One's Have I Got News for You, hosted by Romesh Ranganathan, alongside fellow panellists Ian Hislop, Paul Merton and Jo Brand.

Sissay was appointed Officer of the Order of the British Empire (OBE) in the 2021 Birthday Honours for services to literature and charity. He was quoted in the Hackney Gazette as saying:  "I'm honoured.... If you had gone to my 17-year-old self and said: 'In 2021 the Queen's going to give you [an honour], I would have said: 'No way.' So it's worth believing."

Books

Tender Fingers in a Clenched Fist. Bogle-L'Ouverture, 1988. .
Rebel Without Applause. Bloodaxe Books, 1992 (Canongate Books, 2000). .
Morning Breaks in the Elevator. Canongate Books, 1999. .
The Fire People (editor). Payback Press, 1998. .
The Emperor's Watchmaker. Bloomsbury Children's Books, 2001. .
Listener, Canongate Books, 2008. .
Hidden Gems (ed. Deirdre Osborne; Sissay contributed "Something Dark"), Oberon Books, 2008. .
Refugee Boy, Bloomsbury stage adaptation of Benjamin Zephaniah's novel Refugee Boy, 2013. 
My Name Is Why, autobiography of his early life, with observations on the British care system. Canongate Books, 2019.

Plays

 Skeletons in the Cupboard (1993), Bury Metro Arts 
 Don't Look Down (1993)
 Chaos by Design (1994), Community Arts Workshop 
 Storm  (2002), Contact Theatre
 Something Dark (2006), Battersea Arts Centre/Contact Theatre/Apples and Snakes 
 Why I Don't Hate White People (2011), Hammersmith Lyric Theatre
 Refugee Boy (2013), West Yorkshire Playhouse

BBC radio plays
 Chaos by Design (BBC Radio 1994)
 Something Dark (BBC Radio 2006)
 Something Dark – Live (ABC 2012)
 Why I Don't Hate White People (BBC Radio 3, 2010)

References

External links

 Lemn Sissay website 
Lemn Sissay at the Guardian
"Growing up in an alien environment", BBC 13 October 2006.
"Intelligence Squared" "The voice at the back of the mind". (Video, 6 mins)
Audio recordings. Discogs.
Apples and Snakes profile 
 Badilisha Poetry X-Change contributions
 Webcast Lemn Sissay & Fentahun Tiruneh, Library of Congress, 6 July 2015.

1967 births
Living people
Black British writers
English people of Ethiopian descent
English people of Eritrean descent
People from Higher End
People with avoidant personality disorder
Writers from Manchester
Officers of the Order of the British Empire
English male poets